Goncharov is a Russian surname, an equivalent of the English "Potter" (derived from the Russian word gonchar which means potter), shared by the following people:

Alexander Goncharov, mathematician
Goncharov conjecture
Aleksandr Goncharov (1959–1990), Soviet Russian hockey player
George Goncharov, dance instructor of Margot Fonteyn
Ivan Goncharov (1812-1891), Russian author
Natalya Goncharova (disambiguation), several people
Nikolay Goncharov (born 1984), Russian politician
Pyotr Grigorievich Goncharov (1888-1970), Russian composer
Ruslan Goncharov (b. 1973), Ukrainian figure skater
Valeri Goncharov (b. 1977), Ukrainian gymnast
Vasily Goncharov (1861-1915), Russian film director and screenwriter

See also
Goncharova, a crater on Venus

Occupational surnames
Russian-language surnames